Kristina Igorevna Asmus (born ) is a Russian actress. She is known for her television role in the medical sitcom Interns. She was named the sexiest Russian woman of 2010 by Maxim magazine.

Biography
Asmus came from an athletic background. She was active in gymnastics and rose to the level of Candidate for Master of Sports. Her younger sister, Karina Myasnikova, was a member of Russia's national gymnastics team.

She was still a schoolgirl when she played in the performance of E. Makhonin's "The Dawns Here Are Quiet ..." in theater "MEL", and after graduating from high school in the play N. Yermakova "Portrait of Mademoiselle Tarzhi" in Youth Theatre city of Korolyov.

In 2005, she entered the Moscow Art Theatre School in the course of Konstantin Raikin, but did not finish her studies. In 2008 she entered the Mikhail Shchepkin Higher Theatre School under the course of Boris Klyuyev. Her debut on screen was the role of Vari Chernous in the comedy series Interns. Model of the magazine MAXIM in 2010.

In 2011, Asmus became TV Actress of the Year according to Glamour magazine. 

In 2013, she received Fashion People Awards as Fashion actress.

In 2020 she started gained weight for a movie called Rolls.

In September 2022, during the Russian Invasion of Ukraine, she was accused of criticizing the Russian warfare against the neighbor country, but was not convicted. 

Currently she works in the Yermolova Theatre.

Personal life
Since 2013, she was married to actor and comedian Garik Kharlamov. They have a daughter Anastasia (born 2014). They announced their divorce in 2020.

Filmography

References

External links 
 
 

1988 births
21st-century Russian actresses
Living people
People from Korolyov, Moscow Oblast
Russian activists against the 2022 Russian invasion of Ukraine
Russian film actresses
Russian stage actresses
Russian television actresses
Russian voice actresses